William Timothy Britton (born November 13, 1955) is an American professional golfer who played on the PGA Tour for fifteen years during the 1980s and 1990s.

Britton was born and raised on Staten Island, New York, and attended Monsignor Farrell High School.  He played college golf at Miami Dade College, and in 1975 he won the National Junior College Athletic Association Championship.  He received an athletic scholarship to attend the University of Florida, where he played for coach Buster Bishop's Florida Gators men's golf team in National Collegiate Athletics Association (NCAA) competition in 1976 and 1977.  Britton graduated from Florida with a bachelor's degree in health and human performance in 1979.  He was mentored by Jim Albus, a club professional and six-time winner on the Champions Tour.

Britton is a two-time winner of the Metropolitan Amateur, and was the two-time defending champion when the tournament was held at Century Country Club in Purchase, New York, in 1977. He advanced to the quarterfinals at Century, and played Lou Mattiace, the father of future PGA Tour player Len Mattiace. In a memorable match, Mattiace dethroned the Staten Island native on the 18th green, 1-up.

Britton then turned professional in 1979 and joined the PGA Tour in 1980.

During his 15 years on the Tour, Britton won once and had 23 top-10 finishes. His best finishes in majors came in 1990: T-7 at The Masters and 4th in the PGA Championship.

After his years as a touring pro were over, Britton became a teaching pro and author in New Jersey. He has published articles for The Met Golfer, New Jersey Golfer and Sports Illustrated. He has been named one of the "Top Ten Teachers" in New Jersey by Golf Digest. He was New Jersey Section PGA's Player of the Year in 2002, and Senior Player of the Year in 2006. He has played in a limited number of PGA Tour Champions events, playing his last event in 2017. Britton has been inducted into the Staten Island Sports Hall of Fame.  He currently serves as the head men's golf coach for Monmouth University.

Amateur wins (4)
1975 Metropolitan Amateur, National Junior College Championship
1976 Metropolitan Amateur
1979 Azalea Invitational

Professional wins (5)

PGA Tour wins (1)

*Note: The 1989 Centel Classic was shortened to 54 holes due to rain.

PGA Tour playoff record (0–1)

Other wins (4)
1979 Metropolitan Open
1986 Westchester Open
2005 New Jersey PGA Championship
2006 New Jersey PGA Championship

Results in major championships

Timeline

CUT = missed the half-way cut
"T" = tied

Summary

Most consecutive cuts made – 3 (1989 PGA – 1990 PGA)
Longest streak of top-10s – 2 (1990 Masters – 1990 PGA)

Results in senior major championships

CUT = missed the halfway cut
"T" indicates a tie for a place

See also

Spring 1980 PGA Tour Qualifying School graduates
1983 PGA Tour Qualifying School graduates
1984 PGA Tour Qualifying School graduates
1986 PGA Tour Qualifying School graduates
1987 PGA Tour Qualifying School graduates
1993 PGA Tour Qualifying School graduates
1994 PGA Tour Qualifying School graduates
List of Florida Gators men's golfers on the PGA Tour
List of University of Florida alumni
Staten Island Sports Hall of Fame

References

External links

American male golfers
Florida Gators men's golfers
PGA Tour golfers
Golfers from New York (state)
Miami Dade College alumni
Monsignor Farrell High School alumni
Sportspeople from Staten Island
People from Rumson, New Jersey
1955 births
Living people